Matthew Cao Xiangde (September 1927 – 9 July 2021) was Chinese Roman Catholic bishop of Roman Catholic Diocese of Zhejiang, China.

Biography
Cao was born in 1927 in Pudong District, Shanghai. In 1950, he studied in Jiaxing St. Vincent General Monastery, and transferred to Beijing St. Vincent College in 1952, and studied theology at No. 2 of Ximen street, in Haimen, Zhejiang in 1954. Cao completed his priesthood education in the 1980s in Sheshan and was ordained a priest in 1985.

On 25 June 2000, he became the bishop of the Roman Catholic Archdiocese of Hangzhou without a pontifical mandate, despite strong warnings from the Holy See in advance.

In September 2004, he asked the Holy See to be legittimated. On June 8, 2008, he was recognized as bishop, but without any jurisdiction.

He died on 9 July 2021.

References

See also

1927 births
2021 deaths
21st-century Roman Catholic bishops in China
People from Shanghai